is a passenger railway station located in the city of Matsuyama, Ehime Prefecture, Japan. It is operated by the private transportation company Iyotetsu.

Lines
During most of the day, trains arrive every fifteen minutes. Trains continue from Matsuyama City Station on the Takahama Line to Takahama Station.

Layout
The station consists of one side platform serving a single bi-directional track. The station is attended.

History
Fukuonji Station was opened on January 1, 1968

Surrounding area
Matsuyama Municipal Gospel Elementary School
Matsuyama Gakuin High School
Japan National Route 11

See also
 List of railway stations in Japan

References

External links

Iyotetsu Station Information

Iyotetsu Yokogawara Line
Railway stations in Ehime Prefecture
Railway stations in Japan opened in 1968
Railway stations in Matsuyama, Ehime